Philips van der Aa (died after 1586) was a politician in the Seventeen Provinces and a statesman of the Dutch Republic during its struggle for independence, the Eighty Years' War.

Biography
He was born in Mechelen, and was mayor of the city in 1564, but was banished by the Duke of Alva. He returned on the side of William I, Prince of Orange (William the Silent). In 1572, he came back to power in Mechelen by cunning. In 1573 he was assigned as councillor at the court of Diederik Sonoy, and in 1574 he became commander in Gorkum.

Sources  

 Allgemeine Deutsche Biographie - online version at Wikisource
 Nieuw Nederlandsch Biografisch Woordenboek

1586 deaths
Politicians of the Habsburg Netherlands
Dutch people of the Eighty Years' War (United Provinces)
Mayors of Mechelen
Year of birth unknown